This is a list of supermarket chains in Ukraine.

Supermarkets

Hypermarkets

Other retailers 
Rukavychka
Arsen
Barvinok supermarket 
Bumi-market 
Favoryt 
Intermarket 
La Fourchette 
PAKKO 
Tavria-V 
West Line (supermarket chain)
Kopiyka

Speciality chains

Home Appliances, Electronics and Mobile stores

Furniture stores

Bookstore retailers

References

Ukraine
Supermarkets